Kassagumakhi (Dargwa: Кьассагумахьи) is a rural locality (a selo) and the administrative centre of Kassagumakhinsky Selsoviet, Akushinsky District, Republic of Dagestan, Russia. The population was 138 as of 2010. There are 6 streets.

Geography 
Kassagumakhi is located 37 km south of Akusha (the district's administrative centre) by road, on the Khunikotta River. Gunnamakhi is the nearest rural locality.

References 

Rural localities in Akushinsky District